The Curtiss BF2C Goshawk (Model 67) was a United States 1930s naval biplane aircraft that saw limited success and was part of a long line of Hawk Series airplanes made by the Curtiss Aeroplane and Motor Company for the American military, and for export as the Model 68 Hawk III.

Design and development
The United States Navy and Curtiss felt that the F11C-2 possessed development potential, and the Navy decided to procure a variant with retractable landing gear. This variant, which still had the F11C-2's classic "Hawk" wood wing with its flat-bottomed Clark Y airfoil, was designated XF11C-3 by the Navy and Model 67 by Curtiss. The main gear retraction system was inspired by the Grover Loening-designed system on the Grumman XFF-1 prototype, and was manually operated.

Trials revealed a  increase in speed over the F11C-2, but the extra weight caused a decrease in maneuverability. The Navy felt the handling degradation was more than offset by the increase in speed, however. During testing the XF11C-3 had its wood-framed wing replaced by the metal-structured, biconvex, NACA 2212 airfoil wing, and soon after was redesignated XBF2C-1 (Model 67A) in keeping with the new Bomber-Fighter category.

Operational history

Twenty-seven BF2C-1 were ordered by the U.S. Navy, with a raised rear turtledeck, a semi-enclosed cockpit, and a metal-framed lower wing. Delivered in October 1934, they were assigned to VB-5B on the aircraft carrier , but served only a few months before difficulties with the landing gear led to their withdrawal. In spite of its short service run, many of the innovations developed for the Goshawk line found wide use in Navy aircraft in the years that followed. They were the last Curtiss fighter accepted for service with the U.S. Navy.

The export version Model 68 Hawk III reverted to the classic wood/Clark Y wings and was powered by a  R-1820-F53. Chinese Hawk IIIs served as multi-purpose aircraft when combat operations against the Imperial Japanese Army and Navy Air Forces began in earnest in August 1937, particularly with the Battle of Shanghai and Nanjing, and were considered the Nationalist Chinese Air Force's frontline fighter-pursuit aircraft along with their inventory of Hawk IIs, Boeing Model 281 "Peashooters" and Fiat CR.32s. Col. Gao Zhihang scored a double-kill against the superior Mitsubishi A5M "Claude" (predecessor of the A6M "Zero") over Nanjing on 12 October, 1937 while at the controls of his Hawk III numbered "IV-I" (4th Pursuit Group, Commander). 

As the air-interdiction and close-air support for the National Revolutionary Army of China continued at the Battle of Shanghai on 14 October, 1937, the Chinese Air Force launched a major strike against Japanese positions in Shanghai at 16:00 hours with a uniquely mixed force of three Curtiss Hawk IIIs escorting three B-10s, two He-111As, five O-2MCs and five Gammas from Nanjing in the late-afternoon, and then one strike launched every hour from Nanking to Shanghai in the evening until 03:00 hours on 15 October. These combination of attacks with the Hawk IIIs were used against both the Imperial Japanese Army and Navy Air Forces, and against both ground and naval targets with considerable success through the end of 1937, before being superseded by the better-armed and faster Polikarpov I-15 and I-16 fighters that were supplied to the Chinese Air Force through the Sino-Soviet Treaty of 1937.

In early 1935, Thailand placed an order for 24 Curtiss Hawk IIIs at a cost of 63,900 Baht each, and a manufacturing license was also bought. The first 12 Hawk IIIs were shipped to Thailand in August and the remaining 12 arrived in late 1935, which were named Fighter Type 10. A total of 50 Hawk IIIs were locally built during 1937 and 1939. The type was used against the French in the Franco-Thai War and the Japanese invaders in December 1941, then relegated for use as trainers. Some of these aircraft were still active in 1949 and one airframe (KH-10) survives in the Royal Thai Air Force Museum.

The Model 79 Hawk IV demonstrator had a fully enclosed cockpit and a  R-1820-F56.

Variants
XBF2C-1 Hawk
The XF11C-3 prototype redesignated as a fighter-bomber.
BF2C-1 Goshawk (Model 67A)
Production version of the XF11C-3; 27 built.
Hawk III (Model 68)
Export version of BF2C-1 with an  R-1820-F53 for Argentina, China, Thailand and Turkey; 137 built.
Hawk IV (Model 79)
Export version with an  R-1820-F56 engine; one demonstrator built.

Operators

Army Aviation Service operated ten Model 68A Hawk III and 1 Model 79 Hawk IV.

Republic of China Air Force operated 102 Model 68C Hawk III

Royal Thai Air Force operated 24 Model 68B Hawk III

Turkish Air Force operated one Model 68B Hawk III

United States Navy operated 27 BF2C-1s

Specifications (Hawk III)

References

Further reading

External links

 Images
 "Fast Navy Plane Has Retractable Wheels" Popular Science, July 1934

BF02C
1930s United States fighter aircraft
1930s United States bomber aircraft
Single-engined tractor aircraft
Biplanes
Carrier-based aircraft
Aircraft first flown in 1933
World War II Chinese fighter aircraft